Joe O'Brien (born March 13, 1955) is an American college basketball coach and the former head men's basketball coach at Idaho State University. He has previously served as an assistant coach at Florida International University in Miami, Florida. On April 18, 2009 he received a three-year contract extension to remain as the head basketball coach at Idaho State.  On December 19, 2011 O'Brien stepped down as head coach at Idaho State.

Head coaching record

References

1955 births
Living people
American men's basketball coaches
American men's basketball players
College men's basketball head coaches in the United States
FIU Panthers men's basketball coaches
High school basketball coaches in the United States
Idaho State Bengals men's basketball coaches
Monmouth Fighting Scots men's basketball players
Southeastern Louisiana Lions basketball coaches
Place of birth missing (living people)